Lasiothyris ficta is a species of moth of the family Tortricidae. It is found in Brazil (Mato Grosso, Paraná, Santa Catarina) and Costa Rica.

Subspecies
Lasiothyris ficta ficta (Brazil)
Lasiothyris ficta chydora Razowski, 1999 (Costa Rica)

References

Moths described in 1983
Cochylini